CFO (now CFO.com) is an online publication owned by Industry Dive. It was launched in 1985 for chief financial officers (CFOs) and other financial executives in companies in the U.S. The Economist Group acquired the magazine in 1988 and sold it in 2010 to the private equity firm Seguin Partners. In 2016, CFO was bought from Sequin Partners by Argyle Executive Forum. And finally in 2020 the magazine was acquired by Industry Dive, a business-to-business publisher that provides news to industry executives.
 
CFO.com produces a mixture of regional and global content aimed at CFOs and other decision makers in their respective industries. CFO reaches 440,000 individually qualified readers. The Balance, a trice-weekly email newsletter, is the main component of CFO's content outside of CFO.com. 

CFO.com's staff includes managing director Andy Burt, senior editor at-large Vince Ryan, managing editor Lauren Muskett, senior content strategist Carolina Starin, and reporter Adam Zaki.

References

External links
Official website

1985 establishments in New York (state)
Business magazines published in the United States
Economist Group
Magazines established in 1985
Magazines published in New York City
Monthly magazines published in the United States
Professional and trade magazines